Mount Graham International Observatory (MGIO) is a division of Steward Observatory, the research arm for the Department of Astronomy at The University of Arizona, in the United States. It is located in southeastern Arizona's Pinaleño Mountains near Mount Graham.

Construction of MGIO began in 1989. MGIO currently operates and maintains facilities for three scientific organizations. The first two telescopes, the Vatican Advanced Technology Telescope and the Heinrich Hertz Submillimeter Telescope began operations in 1993. The Large Binocular Telescope, one of the world's largest and most powerful optical telescopes, began operations using mirrors independently in 2004, with joint operations between the two mirrors beginning in 2008.

Public tours of the MGIO are conducted by the Eastern Arizona College's (EAC) Discovery Park Campus between mid-April and mid-October (weather permitting and subject to reservations).

List of facilities
Large Binocular Telescope operated by the Large Binocular Telescope Corporation.
Heinrich Hertz Submillimeter Telescope, operated by Arizona Radio Observatory.
Vatican Advanced Technology Telescope, operated by the Vatican Observatory.

See also
 List of astronomical observatories

References

External links

 Official website
 Mount Graham Clear Sky Clock
 Satellite Picture - Yahoo Maps
 Driving Directions Map

Astronomical observatories in Arizona
Buildings and structures in Graham County, Arizona
Pinaleño Mountains
Tourist attractions in Graham County, Arizona
1989 establishments in Arizona